Kodera is a Japanese surname. Notable people with the surname include:

, Japanese mixed martial artist
, Japanese speed skater

See also
Kōdera, Hyōgo, a former town in Kanzaki District, Hyōgo Prefecture, Japan

Japanese-language surnames